Interstate 485 (I-485) was a proposed auxiliary Interstate Highway that would have traveled eastward and then northward from Downtown Atlanta, in the US state of Georgia.

Route description

The  route would have begun at the Downtown Connector (I-75/I-85) and used the highway that is nowadays State Route 410 (SR 410) east to the interchange with the also-proposed SR 400. There, it would have turned north to end at I-85 near SR 236 (Lindbergh Drive). Each of those freeways would have continued beyond the termini of I-485. SR 410, the Stone Mountain Freeway, would continue east beyond the I-285 perimeter highway, and SR 400 would extend both south and north outside the perimeter. A short piece of I-485/SR 410 was constructed from I-75/I-85 east to Boulevard Northeast.

History

Activists in the neighborhood of Morningside, along the SR 400 portion of I-485, were the first to fight the road, although opposition surfaced in a number of nearby surrounding neighborhoods. This is the most famous example of the Atlanta freeway revolts. After I-485, and parts of SR 400 and SR 410, was canceled, a portion of the right-of-way of the canceled highway was used to build Freedom Parkway, now part of SR 10. SR 400 north of I-85 was constructed in the early 1990s as a toll road, and the section south of I-285 was constructed in the mid-1980s and designated I-675.

See also
 
 
 Transportation in Atlanta
 Interstate 420

References

External links
 
 Interstate 485 Georgia on Interstate-guide.com
 The canceled I-485 route (superimposed on Google Maps)

85-4
85-4 (Georgia)
Interstate 85-4 (Georgia)
4 (Georgia)
85-4 (Georgia)
Roads in Atlanta
Old Fourth Ward